The Boeing B-29 Superfortress is a United States heavy bomber used by the United States Army Air Forces in the Pacific Theatre during World War II, and by the United States Air Force during the Korean War. Of the 3,970 built, 26 survive in complete form today, 24 of which reside in the United States, and two of which are airworthy.

Background
In September 1945, following the surrender of Japan, all contracts for further production of the B-29 were terminated, after 3,970 aircraft (2,766 by Boeing Aircraft, 668 by Bell Aircraft, and 536 by Glenn L. Martin Co.) had been accepted by the USAAF.  Uncompleted airframes at the Boeing Plant in Wichita, Kansas, plant were stripped of all government furnished equipment and scrapped on the flightline.

A vast majority of the B-29s were stored by a new process of cocooning. However, this process trapped heat and moisture, resulting in numerous airframes being damaged by this process (primarily the avionics and instruments).  Between 1946 and 1949, many early and high-time combat veteran aircraft were sold or scrapped. None were released to civilian use.

B-50 was introduced
While the B-29 was still considered useful in the post World War II inventory, the numerous problems with development, (i.e. including the freezing of the design in 1942) and the fear that the postwar US Congress would not fund the purchase of a design that still had significant quantity in storage, led to the radically redeveloped B-29D being re-designated the B-50A.  While the B-50A looked similar to the B-29, Boeing had redeveloped the airframe with a new stronger alloy skin, redesigned main spar, taller vertical stabilizer, and improved engine cowlings.  Additionally, the engines were changed to the R-4360, which produced higher power, had better cooling, and were less prone to failure.

Korean War and super bomber designs
In 1947, with the advent of the USAF, the B-29 was re-designated as a medium bomber. With the new heavy bombers in production such as the Convair B-36 Peacemaker and Northrop YB-49 and the planned production of both the Boeing B-47 Stratojet and the Boeing B-52 Stratofortress becoming a reality, the Superfortress was quickly becoming eclipsed by newer technology. It was only the advent of the Korean War in 1950 which slowed down the retirement of the B-29. Once again, the Superfortress was pressed into combat; while for the first six months the B-29 was able to hold its own, the introduction of jet fighters such as the MiG-15 ended its usefulness; the B-29 was too slow and its defenses were inadequate against fast-moving jets.  By 1953, except for some RB-29s, they were withdrawn from combat.  The remaining B-29s in service were then re-designated as Training (TB-29), Photo Recon (RB-29/F-13), Air-Sea Rescue (SB-29), and refueling/tanker (KB-29M) aircraft. The last USAF flight was in September 1960.

Loaned to the UK
As a stop-gap measure between the Lancaster and Lincoln propeller-driven heavy bombers and new jet V bombers, the Royal Air Force operated 88 leased B-29s in the early 1950s. These received the service name Washington Bomber Mark I.  The Washingtons were largely replaced in service by English Electric Canberra bombers by 1955, the last leaving service in late 1958, when they were retired and returned to the United States. Two Washingtons were transferred to Australia, where the Royal Australian Air Force conducted trials for the British Ministry of Supply. The two aircraft were operated for about four years before they were retired and scrapped.

NACA and the X-planes
The B-29 did enjoy limited success postwar as a flying testbed, being used with NACA to carry the early rocket aircraft (X-1, X-1A, D-558-2, and other test aircraft), prototype jet engine testing, electronic test ships, and High Altitude Atmospheric tests.  During the early 1970s, NASA (the redesignated NACA) sold their P2B-1S (Fertile Myrtle), and for numerous years this aircraft flew under civil registration until it was grounded by spar corrosion.

Museum acquisitions of B-29s
The majority of the surviving B-29s came from airframes that had either been designated (with the US Navy at NAWS China Lake), initially, as target-tow aircraft, then unmanned target aircraft, and finally as a ground target (the last B-29 destroyed was in 1981, more than six years after a ban had been placed on further using these aircraft as targets).  Furthermore, B-29s were used at Aberdeen Proving Grounds as ground targets and survivability studies.

In 1966, the then fledgling Commemorative Air Force, in their quest to gather an example of all the remaining World War II bombers, attempted to track down a B-29.  At this time, except for two noted museum aircraft, the B-29 was considered almost extinct.  Rumors of B-29s existing at Aberdeen Proving Ground revealed several airframes, but due to the closeness of ocean, air these aircraft were corroded close to the point where they were unrestorable. Then, in 1970, came the discovery of the US Navy fleet of aircraft at Naval Air Weapons Station China Lake – these aircraft being used/stored in the desert air were in much better shape.  After a year of negotiation, the CAF was able to obtain their B-29 (Fifi).  These same negotiations also allowed the Imperial War Museum to obtain an example as well (It's Hawg Wild).
Since the early 1970s, numerous other B-29s have been recovered from Aberdeen as well as China Lake for museum displays – the last B-29 (Doc) removed from China Lake in 2000 was restored to flying condition. There are still two partial airframes and one wreck at the NAWS China Lake site.  Several other aircraft were noted as late as 1980, but these aircraft have disappeared  – four having been used in the Disney Picture Last Flight of Noah's Ark, in which two of the airframes were destroyed during production.

Additional aircraft have been discovered at both post-war crash sites and near World War II Pacific airfields.  There is a search for the first B-29 to bomb Japan, Dauntless Dotty which crashed into the Pacific Ocean on take-off during her return flight to the United States. If the airplane is found, there are plans to recover and restore it for display. In 1995, an attempt to recover the Kee Bird, which had crashed in 1947 in northern Greenland, resulted in the almost complete destruction of the plane's fuselage by fire, allegedly started by a malfunctioning Auxiliary power unit in the tail.

Surviving planes

Surviving aircraft by manufacturers

Surviving aircraft

Known wrecks

References

Boeing B-29 Superfortresses
Survivors